The First Baptist Church of Camillus is a historic Baptist church located  at 23 Genesee Street in the Village of Camillus, Onondaga County, New York.   It is credited to architect Archimedes Russell and built in 1879–1880.  It is a brick church building consisting of a rectangular nave with a steeply pitched gable roof, corner bell tower and steeple, and a hip roofed church hall at the rear.  The Camillus Baptist Church was organized in 1804.

It was listed on the National Register of Historic Places in 2001.

Gallery

References

External links

Baptist churches in New York (state)
Churches on the National Register of Historic Places in New York (state)
Historic American Buildings Survey in New York (state)
1804 establishments in New York (state)
Churches completed in 1880
Gothic Revival church buildings in New York (state)
Churches in Onondaga County, New York
National Register of Historic Places in Onondaga County, New York